The Mr. Holland's Opus Foundation is a 501(c)(3) organization  established in 1996 by Michael Kamen (1948-2003), the composer for the motion picture Mr. Holland's Opus. It is headquartered in Studio City, Los Angeles.

According to the Foundation's website, "MHOF donates musical instruments to music programs where students have access to a music curriculum but lack the resources and support base to adequately keep up with equipment loss due to attrition, depreciation and wear over time. An infusion of instruments and repairs enables more students to participate and experience a quality music education." The stated goal of MHOF is to "help children achieve their greatest potential and to close the gap that exists in underserved communities."

2007 revenue was $2.8 million, of which 12 percent came from corporate donations, 27 percent from other foundations, and 10 percent from individual contributors. In 2007, more than 91 percent ($2.5 million) of MHOF's revenue was used to fund music program expenses.  Management and fundraising expenditures totaled 2 percent each.
Charity Navigator rates the Foundation four stars.

In twenty-four years the Foundation has donated more than 33,000 instruments to over 2 million students. A number of well known musicians, philanthropists, and foundations have donated their time and money including, Eddie and Janie Van Halen, Jean and Alex Trebek, the Prince Estate, the Louis Armstrong Educational Foundation, and the Walt Disney Company Foundation.

References

External links
 
Charity Navigator - The Mr. Holland's Opus Foundation
NAMM Oral History Interview with Executive Director, Felice Mancini (2010)

1996 establishments in California
501(c)(3) organizations
Charities based in California
Music education organizations
Organizations based in Los Angeles
Organizations established in 1996
Works by Michael Kamen